Crescent City is a city in Putnam County, Florida, United States. As of the 2020 Census, its population was 1,654. The city is located on two lakes and is part of the Palatka Micropolitan Statistical Area. Crescent Lake lies to the east of town and Lake Stella is located to the west.

Geography

The city is located between two lakes, Lake Stella to the west and Lake Crescent to the east.

Climate

Demographics

As of the census of 2000, there were 1,776 people, 678 households, and 435 families residing in the city. The racial makeup of the city was 57.32% White, 34.46% African American, 0.39% Native American, 0.73% Asian, 5.74% from other races, and 1.35% from two or more races. Hispanic or Latino of any race were 14.53% of the population.

There were 678 households, out of which 27.7% had children under the age of 18 living with them, 40.4% were married couples living together, 18.7% had a female householder with no husband present, and 35.8% were non-families. 31.1% of all households were made up of individuals, and 16.7% had someone living alone who was 65 years of age or older. The average household size was 2.49 and the average family size was 3.12.

In the city, the population was spread out, with 27.4% under the age of 18, 7.4% from 18 to 24, 21.6% from 25 to 44, 20.9% from 45 to 64, and 22.7% who were 65 years of age or older. The median age was 40 years. For every 100 females, there were 86.4 males. For every 100 females age 18 and over, there were 81.8 males.

The median income for a household in the city was $22,500, and the median income for a family was $28,913. Males had a median income of $26,786 versus $15,887 for females. The per capita income for the city was $12,767. About 24.5% of families and 27.9% of the population were below the poverty line, including 35.2% of those under age 18 and 15.3% of those age 65 or over.

The population was 1,776 at the 2000 census. According to the U.S Census estimates of 2005, the city had a population of 1,817.

History
A. Philip Randolph, the founder of the Brotherhood of Sleeping Car Porters, was born in Crescent City in 1889. Randolph would become a prominent civil rights leader, especially during the Civil Rights Movement in the 1950s and 1960s. Randolph Street in Crescent City is named after this influential figure.

Crescent City has two listings on the National Register of Historic Places, Hubbard House and the Crescent City Historic District.

Eagle's Nest Grove in Crescent City is the oldest continuous organic citrus grove in Florida.

Government 
Crescent City is governed by a mayor and a five-member city council.

As of 2020, the mayor is Michele Myers, and the commission members are H. Harry Banks, Judith West, Lisa DeVitto, and Cynthia Burton.

The City Manager is Charles Rudd.

See also
Crescent City High School

References

Cities in Putnam County, Florida
Cities in Florida